Membrane proteins are common proteins that are part of, or interact with, biological membranes. Membrane proteins fall into several broad categories depending on their location.  Integral membrane proteins are a permanent part of a cell membrane and can either penetrate the membrane (transmembrane) or associate with one or the other side of a membrane (integral monotopic). Peripheral membrane proteins are transiently associated with the cell membrane.

Membrane proteins are common, and medically important—about a third of all human proteins are membrane proteins, and these are targets for more than half of all drugs.  Nonetheless, compared to other classes of proteins, determining membrane protein structures remains a challenge in large part due to the difficulty in establishing experimental conditions that can preserve the correct conformation of the protein in isolation from its native environment.

Function 
Membrane proteins perform a variety of functions vital to the survival of organisms:
 Membrane receptor proteins relay signals between the cell's internal and external environments.
 Transport proteins move molecules and ions across the membrane. They can be categorized according to the Transporter Classification database.
 Membrane enzymes may have many activities, such as oxidoreductase, transferase or hydrolase.
 Cell adhesion molecules allow cells to identify each other and interact. For example, proteins involved in immune response

The localization of proteins in membranes can be predicted reliably using hydrophobicity analyses of protein sequences, i.e. the localization of hydrophobic amino acid sequences.

Integral membrane proteins

Integral membrane proteins are permanently attached to the membrane. Such proteins can be separated from the biological membranes only using detergents, nonpolar solvents, or sometimes denaturing agents. They can be classified according to their relationship with the bilayer:

 Integral polytopic proteins are transmembrane proteins that span across the membrane more than once. These proteins may have different transmembrane topology. These proteins have one of two structural architectures:
Helix bundle proteins, which are present in all types of biological membranes;
 Beta barrel proteins, which are found only in outer membranes of Gram-negative bacteria, and outer membranes of mitochondria and chloroplasts.
 Bitopic proteins are transmembrane proteins that span across the membrane only once. Transmembrane helices from these proteins have significantly different amino acid distributions to transmembrane helices from polytopic proteins.
 Integral monotopic proteins are integral membrane proteins that are attached to only one side of the membrane and do not span the whole way across.

Peripheral membrane proteins

Peripheral membrane proteins are temporarily attached either to the lipid bilayer or to integral proteins by a combination of hydrophobic, electrostatic, and other non-covalent interactions. Peripheral proteins dissociate following treatment with a polar reagent, such as a solution with an elevated pH or high salt concentrations.

Integral and peripheral proteins may be post-translationally modified, with added fatty acid, diacylglycerol or prenyl chains, or GPI (glycosylphosphatidylinositol), which may be anchored in the lipid bilayer.

Polypeptide toxins

Polypeptide toxins and many antibacterial peptides, such as colicins or hemolysins, and certain proteins involved in apoptosis, are sometimes considered a separate category. These proteins are water-soluble but can aggregate and associate irreversibly with the lipid bilayer and become reversibly or irreversibly membrane-associated.

In genomes 
Membrane proteins, like soluble globular proteins, fibrous proteins, and disordered proteins, are common.  It is estimated that 20–30% of all genes in most genomes encode for membrane proteins. For instance, about 1000 of the ~4200 proteins of E. coli are thought to be membrane proteins, 600 of which have been experimentally verified to be membrane resident.  In humans, current thinking suggests that fully 30% of the genome encodes membrane proteins.

In disease 
Membrane proteins are the targets of over 50% of all modern medicinal drugs.  Among the human diseases in which membrane proteins have been implicated are heart disease, Alzheimer's and cystic fibrosis.

Purification of membrane proteins 
Although membrane proteins play an important role in all organisms, their purification has historically, and continues to be, a huge challenge for protein scientists.  In 2008, 150 unique structures of membrane proteins were available, and by 2019 only 50 human membrane proteins had had their structures elucidated.  In contrast, approximately 25% of all proteins are membrane proteins.  Their hydrophobic surfaces make structural and especially functional characterization difficult.  Detergents can be used to render membrane proteins water-soluble, but these can also alter protein structure and function.  Making membrane proteins water-soluble can also be achieved through engineering the protein sequence, replacing selected hydrophobic amino acids with hydrophilic ones, taking great care to maintain secondary structure while revising overall charge.

Affinity chromatography is one of the best solutions for purification of membrane proteins. The activity of membrane proteins decreases very fast in contrast to other proteins. So, affinity chromatography provides a fast and specific purification of membrane proteins. The polyhistidine-tag is a commonly used tag for membrane protein purification, and the alternative rho1D4 tag has also been successfully used.

Further reading

See also

References

External links

Organizations
 Membrane Protein Structural Dynamics Consortium
Experts for Membrane Protein Research and Purification

Membrane protein databases
 TCDB - Transporter Classification database, a comprehensive classification of transmembrane transporter proteins
 Orientations of Proteins in Membranes (OPM) database - 3D structures of integral and peripheral membrane proteins arranged in the lipid bilayer
 Protein Data Bank of Transmembrane Proteins - 3D models of transmembrane proteins approximately arranged in the lipid bilayer.
 TransportDB - Genomics-oriented database of transporters from TIGR
 Membrane PDB - Database of 3D structures of integral membrane proteins and hydrophobic peptides with an emphasis on crystallization conditions
 Mpstruc database  - A curated list of selected transmembrane proteins from the Protein Data Bank
 MemProtMD - a database of membrane protein structures simulated by coarse-grained molecular dynamics
 Membranome database provides information about bitopic proteins from several model organisms